Plummer Bernard Young Sr. (July 27, 1884 – October 9, 1962), better known as P. B. Young was a newspaper editor, publisher, community leader, and founder of the Norfolk Journal and Guide. He was African American.

Early life and education
Plummer Bernard Young was born July 27, 1884, in Littleton, North Carolina. His father, Winfield Young, was born into slavery in 1848 in Halifax County, but learned to read and write under the tutelage of his master's wife. Between 1870 and 1880, Winfield and his young wife, Sallie Adams, moved from Halifax County into Littleton proper, where he ran a dry goods store. The Young family (Plummer had four older siblings) attended two black churches in Littleton: first Enon Baptist Church and later St. Anna's Episcopal Church, the church of Plummer's childhood. Plummer attended the elementary and secondary grades at Reedy Creek Academy, a Baptist-run private school set up to educate black children. In addition, Winfield tutored his son at the store when business was quiet.

In May 1884, Winfield Young founded the True Reformer, a weekly newspaper of Littleton. According to biographer Henry Lewis Suggs, Plummer "credited much of his learning to the True Reformer and to his employment as an errand boy for a local white daily."

In 1900, Plummer began receiving higher education at St. Augustine's University in Raleigh, North Carolina. In September 1902 he started classes in the normal department. The following year he was a student in the print shop, which he went on to supervise between 1904 and 1906. During this time, he continued to take classes, like math and history, part-time in the normal department.

While at St. Augustine's, Young met Eleanor Louise White, a preparatory department teacher. Eleanor, the adopted daughter of the college president, graduated from St. Augustine's in 1906, at which time she and Young married. The couple returned to Littleton, where their first son, Plummer Bernard Jr., was born in February 1907.

Career
In June 1907, Young moved his family from Littleton, North Carolina, to Norfolk, Virginia, where he had accepted a job offer as a plant foreman for the Lodge Journal and Guide. Young's first order of business was to compel the Guide's owners, the Supreme Lodge Knights of Gideon, to replace their flat-bed, manual press with a slightly more modern, drum-cylinder power press. This, along with other small operational and editorial improvements, helped the weekly's circulation grow from 600 to 1,000 copies by the end of the year.

In 1909, after the resignation of editor J. Henry Cromwell, Young volunteered for and was given editorship of the Guide. The 24-year-old Young assumed editorial duties in addition to those of foreman. By 1910, the Gideons decided to sell the business, which Young purchased for $3,050. He made his brother Henry Cheatham a partner and plant foreman. In 1911, the business was granted a charter, with Young as president, Eleanor as treasurer, and Henry as secretary. Young changed the official name of the paper from the Lodge Journal and Guide to the Norfolk Journal and Guide. In December 1913, the Guide suffered a heavy loss, including its archive, when its Church Street plant was heavily damaged by fire. Operations moved twice between then and January 1917. By the end of 1919, the paper had grown to eight pages and circulation reached 4000. In addition to Young's wife and brother, the Guide also employed his sons Thomas and P. B. Jr. and his father, Winfield. Per biographer, Suggs, "The Guide, in short, was a family business."

Death and legacy 
Plummer Bernard Young Sr. died October 9, 1962, in Norfolk General Hospital, Norfolk, Virginia. Eleanor White Young had died in 1946 and Plummer remarried in 1950 to Josephine Tucker Moseley. Plummer was survived by Josephine and by his sons, P. B. Jr. and Thomas W. Young. At the time, P. B. Jr. was editor-in-chief of the Guide and Thomas was president and general manager of the Guide Publishing Company.

Two days after his death, the editorial board of The Virginian-Pilot featured a tribute to Young calling him a newspaper publisher of "stability, courage, and persistence in seeking the betterment of the Negro minority for which he spoke, and a competence of craftsmanship that won him the respect of all newspapermen who read his newspaper."

In addition to receiving honorary degrees from many historically black colleges and universities, Young also served on the board of trustees of Hampton Institute, Hampton, Virginia; St. Paul's College, Lawrenceville, Virginia; Palmer Memorial Institute, Sedalia, North Carolina; and Howard University, Washington, D.C.. Young was also chairman of the Howard University board for six years.

Honors and awards
Honorary degree, Shaw University, Raleigh, North Carolina
Honorary degree, Virginia Union University, Richmond, Virginia
Honorary degree, Virginia State College, Ettrick, Virginia
Honorary degree, Morehouse College, Atlanta, Georgia
Honorary degree, Tuskegee Institute, Tuskegee, Alabama

In 1995, the North Carolina Department of Natural and Cultural Resources erected a historical marker on U.S. Route 158 in Littleton, North Carolina, to commemorate Young's life and achievements.

See also
Claude Albert Barnett - fellow African American publisher and Young contemporary
William Washington Browne - founder of the Grand Fountain of the United Order of True Reformers
National Newspaper Publishers Association - formerly the National Negro Publishers Association

References

External links
 Plummer Bernard Young Sr. at Findagrave

1884 births
1962 deaths
African-American businesspeople
African-American journalists
20th-century American journalists
American male journalists
African-American publishers (people)
American publishers (people)
Businesspeople from North Carolina
20th-century American businesspeople
20th-century African-American people